Stephen W. Perkins (1809—after 1869) was an American political figure in the Republic of Texas and early statehood Texas who, in 1846–47, served as Speaker of the Texas House of Representatives during the First Texas Legislature.

A native of Kentucky, Perkins moved in 1840 to Texas' Brazoria County, where he founded a plantation in the village of Bailey's Prairie.  In 1844 he was elected to the Texas House in the Ninth Congress of the Republic of Texas. Perkins was on the committee charged to write an "Address to the People of Texas" in regard to annexation.

After the annexation of Texas, Perkins was elected to the House of Representatives of the First Texas Legislature, and to the Senate of the Second Legislature. During his time in the House, Perkins was elected Speaker after the resignation of William H. Bourland.

After fulfilling his legislative duties, Perkins served as chief justice of Brazoria County from 1850 until 1862. In that year, at the age of 53, with the Civil War at full momentum, he reported as a private in the Brazoria Volunteers of the Rio Grande Regiment, a home guard company. In 1866 he was re-elected to his former judicial post in Brazoria County, but the regional Union commander, Major General Joseph J. Reynolds removed him from office on April 25, 1869 as "an impediment to Reconstruction".

Stephen W. Perkins had married in 1850, but his wife, Anne E., died before 1860. No specific documentation has been produced to indicate his activity after 1869, including the year of his death.

Notes

References

Speakers of the Texas House of Representatives
Members of the Texas House of Representatives
Texas state senators
Texas state court judges
People of Texas in the American Civil War
People of the Reconstruction Era
People from Kentucky
People from Brazoria County, Texas
1809 births
19th-century deaths
Year of death missing
Place of birth unknown
Place of death missing
Date of birth unknown
19th-century American politicians
19th-century American judges